Longsight Diesel TMD is a railway diesel locomotive traction maintenance depot (TMD) situated in Longsight, Manchester, England. The depot code is LO. There are various roads in which individual train sets can be overhauled.

History
In 1987, the depot had an allocation of Class 08s and DMUs. Although, Classes 31 and 47 could also usually be seen stabled at the depot.

Allocation and services
In 1979 Longsight supplied shunters to ten different locations. Locally three Air-Braked locos covered operations as depot pilot, at Mayfield parcels depot and also Trafford Park Container terminal with this turn also covering operations at Manchester International Freight Terminal. Five further shunters were outstationed to Guide Bridge working Dewsnap Yard and Ashburys Yard. Further afield one shunter worked Stockport carriage and parcels sidings while another operated freight trips in the Buxton area. To cover these operations, Longsight had an allocation of 14 Class 08 shunters, while in the same year there were 19 Class 25s and 40 Class 40s allocated there as well, plus DMUs of classes 100 and 108. In the following year there were no passenger train duties planned for Class 25 locomotives based at Longsight, but there were a variety of diagrams for Class 40s predmonantly on summer-only services from Manchester to destinations in North Wales.

Locomotives at Longsight changed in line with the general motive power developments in British Rail in the 1980s so that by 1985 there were 7 Class 31s which replaced the Class 25s, and the Class 40s were down to a single locomotive (based at Kingmoor) thus ending the long association of Longsight with this class. The allocation of Class 08 shunters had risen to 17 although one of these was stored in an unserviceable condition. All of the DMU allocation had also been moved away, but the Class 118s that were being converted for parcels use were provisionally shown as allocated to Longsight. For the locomotives the Class 31's, like the Class 25's, were not diagrammed for any passenger trains, and with the demise of the Class 40s the North Wales traffic had been taken over by Class 45s from Toton, meaning that there were no passenger trains diagrammed for haulage by diesel locomotives based at Longsight.

The changes of the 1980s were almost complete by 1986 as the only locomotives allocated to Longsight were 14 Class 08 shunters, and the only other allocation were the 2-car Class 118 units that had been converted for parcels use, the main-line diesels having been reallocated elsewhere or withdrawn.

See also
Longsight Electric TMD

References

Citations

References

Other sources

External links

Railway depots in England
Buildings and structures in Manchester
Rail transport in Greater Manchester